Einer may refer to:

 11728 Einer, a main-belt asteroid
 Hans Einer (1856–1927), an Estonian teacher, author and public figure

Given name
 Einer Bankz American musician
 Einer Boberg (1935-1995), a Danish-Canadian speech pathologist 
 Einer Jensen (1899–1976), a Danish boxer
 Einer P. Lund (born 1903), an American politician
 Einer Nielsen (1894–1965), a Danish spiritualist
 Einer Rubio (born 1998), Colombian cyclist
 Einer Ulrich (1896–1969), a Danish tennis player
 Einer Viveros (born 1970), a Colombian football player

See also
Einar
Ejnar
Ejner